The L. Dale Mitchell Baseball Park is home to the University of Oklahoma Sooners baseball team.

About
Mitchell Park was named after Dale Mitchell, a mid-1940s Sooner letterman who holds OU's career and single-season batting records. The park was originally constructed at a cost of $1.27 million and was dedicated in 1982.

Renovations
Renovations during the 1998 season included an upper concourse plus additional rest rooms and concession stands. The locker room, training room and equipment room were also updated. Prior to the 2002 season, the press box and broadcast booths were significantly expanded and an elevator and VIP suites were added.

OU added a practice facility prior to the 2009 season including a regulation-size natural grass infield and a 5,160 square-foot indoor hitting facility. The building contains three full-size pitching and hitting lanes and is heated and air conditioned. The addition covered 22,500 square feet of existing ground down the left-field line adjacent to the Sooner bullpen.
 
The ballpark received a new video and scoreboard in left field in 2009, and new chair back seats were added prior to the 2011 and 2012 seasons. Also in 2012, a new warning track was installed as well as field turf in the foul territory around the infield.

Attendance
In 2011, the Sooners ranked 42nd in Division I college baseball in attendance, averaging 1,305 per home game.

See also
 List of NCAA Division I baseball venues

References

External links 
SoonerSports.com - OU Baseball Photo Gallery

Oklahoma Sooners baseball
Sports venues in Oklahoma
College baseball venues in the United States
Baseball venues in Oklahoma
University of Oklahoma campus
1982 establishments in Oklahoma
Sports venues completed in 1982